How I Loved You is the second studio album by American folk rock band Angels of Light. Produced by band leader Michael Gira, it was released on March 27, 2001, via Gira's own record label, Young God Records. The album features contributions from Bee and Flower bassist and vocalist Dana Schechter, drummer Thor Harris, singer-songwriter Bliss Blood and ex-Nick Cave and the Bad Seeds guitarist Kid Congo Powers.

The cover art of the album depicts Gira's mother, Alice Schulte Gira, while the back cover features a picture of his father, Robert Pierre Gira.

Background
On the album's composition, band leader Michael Gira wrote on the website for Young God Records:

Critical reception

The album generally received positive reviews from music critics. Thom Jurek of Allmusic wrote: "Angels of Light's How I Loved You moves far from that terrain and into a zone of languid reverie, bittersweet longing, and crystalline excess," while also stating that the record "reveals, once more, that for Michael Gira and his Angels of Light, there are no contradictions, no gods, and no monsters in the caverns of love's secret domain." John Robinson of NME stated: "Like a dark meeting place for a tryst between Nick Cave and Sonic Youth, they take a funereal subject matter (e.g. "My Suicide"), and expand it over beautifully arranged and very huge spaces of time". Wilson Neate of Popmatters wrote: "Leonard Cohen once recorded a rather dark album called Songs of Love and Hate. The Angels of Light’s How I Loved You makes that record sound like a children’s birthday party," while another Popmatters reviewer, Jason Thompson, commented: "How I Loved You is a successful and unique collection of love songs." The latter writer also described the album as "harrowing, but passionate."

Nevertheless,  Richard M. Juzwiak of Pitchfork gave the album a negative review, stating: "The fact that Gira attempts the monumental, snug fit is admirable. Sure, he sounds like he means what he's saying, but his esoteric words seem born more out of self-satisfaction than pleasing listeners. Ultimately, conviction does not compensate for inaccessibility; Gira's calluses, you see, sound much more like warts."

Track listing

On the physical CD, track 6 is labeled "New City in the Future", on all digital releases it is labeled "New York City in the Future".

Personnel
Angels of Light
Michael Gira - vocals, acoustic and electric guitar, production

Additional musicians
Christoph Hahn – lap steel guitar, electric guitar
Dana Schechter – bass guitar, piano, melodica, backing vocals
Lawrence Mullins – drums, vibraphone, timpani, Farfisa vip 600 organ, sleigh bells, tambourine, castanets, glockenspiel
Birgit-Cassis Staudt – accordion, melodica, Cassio, piano, backing vocals
Thor Harris – hammered dulcimer, piano, backing vocals
Bliss Blood – backing vocals (2); double vocal (2); ukulele
Siobhan Duffy – backing vocals (5); double vocal (5)
Kid Congo Powers – additional electric guitar (3, 8)

Other personnel
Doug Henderson – editing, engineering, mixing, overdubbing
Chad Swanberg – engineering

References

External links
 How I Loved You on Young God Records

2001 albums
Angels of Light albums
Young God Records albums
Albums produced by Michael Gira